John Bester (1927-2010), born and educated in England, was one of the foremost translators of modern Japanese fiction. He was a graduate of the University of London's School of Oriental and African Studies.

Works
 Classic Bonsai of Japan (New York: Kodansha International, 1989).

Translations
Among his translations are:
 Masterworks of Ukiyo-E: Utamaro by Muneshige Narazaki and Sadao Kikuchi (translation published in 1968).
 Black Rain by Masuji Ibuse (translation published in 1969).
 Sun and Steel by Yukio Mishima (autobiography, translation published in 1970). 
 The Waiting Years by Fumiko Enchi (translation published in 1971).
 The Anatomy of Dependence by Takeo Doi (translation published in 1973).
 The Silent Cry by Kenzaburō Ōe (translation published in 1974).
 The Dark Room by Junnosuke Yoshiyuki (translation published in 1975).
 The Reluctant Admiral by Hiroyuki Agawa (biography of Isoroku Yamamoto, commander in chief of the Imperial Japanese Navy, translation published in 1979)
 Salamander and Other Stories by Masuji Ibuse (translation published in 1981).
 Acts of Worship: Seven Stories by Yukio Mishima (translation published in 1989).
 Once and Forever, the tales of Kenji Miyazawa by Kenji Miyazawa (includes Gauche the Cellist, translation published in 1993).
 Confessions of a Yakuza by Junichi Saga (reminiscenes of a Yakuza boss, translation published in 1995.
A Boy Called H by Kappa Senoh, translation published in 1999.

John Bester received the 1990 Noma Award for the Translation of Japanese Literature for Acts of Worship.

References 

1927 births
Alumni of SOAS University of London
English translators
Japanese–English translators
2010 deaths
English male non-fiction writers
20th-century British translators